Ritlal Yadav or Ritlal Ray is a leader of RJD who won the Bihar Legislative Council election in July 2015 as an independent candidate. Ritlal was in jail in connection with multiple criminal cases, including murder charges. Ritlal is accused in over 33 cases.
He was a former Member of Legislative Council (MLC), the post, to which he was elected in 2016. He was incarcerated in Beur Jail until August 2020.  However he was then released from the jail on bail.

Life and career
Ritlal Yadav came to limelight in 2003 when Lalu Prasad Yadav was undertaking his Tel Pilawan lathi ghumawan Yatra to garner the support of Biharis for his party. According to media report; in the meantime Ritlal was made an accused in the assassination of Bhartiya Janata Party leader Satyanarayan Sinha at Jamaluddin chowk near Khagaul. He is also named in several other serious cases like extortion and murder. Ritlal wields considerable influence on all railway tenders of Danapur division. According to media reports he is also accused in assassination of his rival Chunnu Singh at Chhath ghat in Neura. Yadav is also prime accused in assassination of two railway contractors in a running train near Bakhtiyarpur.

Yadav came into contact with Lalu Prasad when one of his associates Ram Kripal Yadav defected from him and was to contest against his daughter Misa Bharti. Though Ritlal promised Lalu he would support Misa Bharti to win in the election against Ram Kripal Yadav, she lost. He later joined Rashtriya Janata Dal and Lalu Prasad made him the General Secretary of the party. In 2010 Ritlal surrendered in the court for the numerous charges which were lodged against him and contested the Bihar Assembly Elections of 2010 from the prison but he lost it. In 2015 Janata Dal (United), the arch rival of Rashtriya Janata Dal allied with it to take on Bharatiya Janata Party led alliance in Bihar Legislative Assembly Elections of 2015. Lalu couldn't provide ticket to Yadav from Danapur, hence he violated the party discipline by filing nomination as independent candidate from the same constituency which led to his expulsion from the RJD. He contested the elections to Bihar Legislative Council from within the jail in 2016 and became Member of Legislative Council. In August 2020 he was released from the jail on bail. In 2020 Bihar Assembly Election Rashtriya Janata Dal made Ritlal its candidate from Danapur assembly.

In the 2020 elections to Bihar Assembly Ritlal faced Asha Devi, the wife of Satyanarayan Sinha who was allegedly murdered by his men. After the incarceration of Yadav she had been winning Danapur seat for three consecutive terms on the ticket of Bhartiya Janata Party.

References

Criminals from Bihar
People from Patna
Crime in Bihar
Indian prisoners and detainees
Living people
Members of the Bihar Legislative Council
Rashtriya Janata Dal politicians
Bihar MLAs 2020–2025
Year of birth missing (living people)

External links
Danapur Election 2020: दबंग रीतलाल यादव राजद के टिकट पर दानापुर से ठोकेंगे ताल , राजद में कई बाहुबलियों को मिला सिंबल